Richard Wingfield, 1st Viscount Powerscourt, PC (1550 – 9 September 1634) was an English-born army officer and military administrator during the reigns of Elizabeth I and James I. He is notable for his defeat of Sir Cahir O'Doherty's forces at the 1608 Battle of Kilmacrennan during O'Doherty's Rebellion in Ireland.

Family
Sir Richard Wingfield was the son of Sir Richard Wingfield, Governor of Portsmouth, who was descended from an old Suffolk family, and Christian, daughter of Sir William Fitzwilliam of Milton, Castor, Northamptonshire, and sister of Sir William Fitzwilliam, Lord Deputy of Ireland. He became the step-son of Sir George Delves, after his mother's remarriage.

Early career
He came to Ireland as a military adventurer in the latter part of the 16th century and afterwards fought in Flanders, France and Portugal, gaining the military rank of lieutenant colonel.

Returning to Ireland, Wingfield distinguished himself and was wounded in an expedition against Tyrone, and was knighted by the Lord Deputy, William Russell, in Christ Church Cathedral on 9 November 1595. He served as a colonel in the expedition against Calais, and in 1600 was advanced to the office of Marshal of Ireland, with a retinue of fifty horse and a company of foot. In 1601 he led a force at the reduction of Kinsale, and was one of those who signed the articles of capitulation made between the Lord Deputy of Ireland and Don Juan del Águila, commander of the Spanish troops made prisoners on that occasion.

O'Doherty's Rebellion

In May 1608 during O'Doherty's Rebellion he marched into Ulster against Sir Cahir O'Doherty, who had burnt Derry, killing him and dispersing his followers. For this success Sir Richard was on 29 June 1609 rewarded by a grant of the Powerscourt Estate in County Wicklow.

Later career

In the Parliament of Ireland of 1613–15, he sat in the Irish House of Commons as MP for Downpatrick.

On 19 February 1618, he was created Viscount Powerscourt, and he subsequently enjoyed several important offices under the Crown.

Marriage
He married Frances Rugge, (or Repps), (died before 30 November 1631), daughter of William Rugge, (or Repps), of Felmingham, Norfolk, and Thomasine Townshend, and widow of Edward Cromwell, 3rd Baron Cromwell. Frances Cromwell, the elder of her two daughters, married Sir John Wingfield of Tickencote, Rutland in January 1619. Her younger daughter, Anne Cromwell, married her husband's cousin, Sir Edward Wingfield of Carnew, County Wicklow on 9 May 1619.

Death
He died on 9 September 1634, without issue from his wife, Frances and his title, therefore, became extinct. His estates passed to his cousin, Sir Edward Wingfield. The title was revived in 1665 in the person of Folliott Wingfield, 1st Viscount Powerscourt, who died without issue in 1717; and again in 1743 for Richard Wingfield.

Notes

Attribution

References

External links

 Richard Wingfield, Viscount Powerscourt Family tree
 
 Wingfield, Tony Early Origin of the Wingfields

1550s births
1634 deaths
Kingdom of England people in the Kingdom of Ireland
Viscounts in the Peerage of Ireland
Peers of Ireland created by James I
16th-century English nobility
16th-century Irish people
17th-century Irish people
People of O'Doherty's rebellion
Richard
Military personnel from Suffolk
Irish MPs 1613–1615
Members of the Parliament of Ireland (pre-1801) for County Down constituencies